Horace Mitchell (19 January 1858 – 4 January 1951) was an English cricketer. Mitchell was a right-handed batsman by bowled right-arm medium-fast. He was born at West Tarring, Sussex.

Mitchell made his first-class debut for Sussex against the Marylebone Cricket Club in 1882. He made two further appearances in that season for Sussex against Hampshire and Yorkshire, before next appearing for Sussex in first-class cricket in the 1891 County Championship against Lancashire. He made four further first-class appearances for the county in 1891, the last of which came against Surrey. With his role as a bowler, Mitchell took a total of 19 wickets at an average of 18.68, with best figures of 5/35. These figures were his only five-wicket haul and came against Lancashire in 1891. A poor batsman, Mitchell scored 44 runs at a batting average of 4.00, with a high score of 9.

He died at the village of his birth on 4 January 1951.

References

External links
Horace Mitchell at ESPNcricinfo
Horace Mitchell at CricketArchive

1858 births
1951 deaths
People from Tarring, West Sussex
English cricketers
Sussex cricketers